Vivian Villarreal (born 30 January 1965) is a former professional American pool player. She was the World Pool-Billiard Association world number one women's player for five years, and has twice been runner up in the WPA World Nine-ball Championship.

Career
Villarreal's grandmother, Amalia Huerta, was the owner of Mollie's Lounge, a restaurant and bar with a pool table, in San Antonio. Villarreal sometimes helped with cleaning and became interested in pool. She started to play at the age of 8, and by the time she was 11, had accumulated 161 trophies.

She gave up playing pool for about 10 years from the age of 14 to focus on her studies. Villarreal graduated from Lee High School, and went on to study computer science, book-keeping and accounting at San Antonio College.

Villarreal started playing again, and participated in the Women's Professional Billiard Association circuit in 1992, winning her first title at the Wahine Open in Hilo, Hawaii her first year. She won several more titles over the following years and in 1996 won the ESPN World Open 9-Ball Championship. 

In 1992, she was runner-up in WPA World Nine-ball championship, losing to Franziska Stark, and in 1996 was beaten in the final of the competition by Gerda Hofstatter.

She is known as "The Texas Tornado" for her rapid and demonstrative style of play.

The Women's Professional Billiard Association inducted Villarreal to its Hall of Fame in 2015.

Personal life and charitable work

She adopted a child in 1992, but the child was taken away by her biological mother in 1997 following a court-approved visitation. Villarreal spent some eight years searching for the child, who was finally discovered to be in Arkansas. Villarreal subsequently agreed that the child could choose where to stay, and the child continued to live with her biological mother whilst maintaining contact with Villarreal.

Villareal is the founder of The Tornado Foundation, which has a broad mission to help "any child, animal or victim in need of assistance" and organises a pool event called The Tornado Open to benefit the Foundation.

Titles won
1988 McDermott 8-Ball Championship 
1990 Summertime Classic 9-Ball
1991 Wahine Classic 9-Ball
1991 Alamo City 9-Ball Open
1992 International 9-Ball Classic
1992 McDermont 9-Ball Championship
1992 WPBA National Championship
1993 Kasson Chicago Classic	
1992 Champs Billiards 9-Ball Open
1992 Rum Runner 9-Ball Open
1993 McDermott National 9-Ball Tour 
1993 WPA World Tour Championship 
1993 Bicycle Club 9-Ball Classic
1994 WPBA Baltimore Classic 
1994 San Antonio Rose 9-Ball Open
1994 Huebler Cues Seattle Classic
1994 Cuetec Cues Charlotte Classic
1994 Viking Cues Milwaukee Classic
1994 McDermontt Heritage Classic 
1994 Connelly Billiards Denver Classic
1994 Mosconi Cup 
1995 Viking Cues Charlotte Classic
1996 ESPN Open 9-Ball Championship
1996 Connelly Philadelphia Players Classic
1996 Pool & Billiard Magazine Detroit Classic
1996 Gordon's Boston 9-Ball
1998 Brunswick Billiards New York Classic
2000 Texas 9-Ball Open 
2001 Houston 9-ball Open 
2002 Florida 9-Ball Open
2003 Texas Open 9-Ball Championship
2003 Fast Eddie's Tour
2005 Ladies Spirit Tour
2010 Fast Eddie's Tour
2011 CSI US Bar Table 8-Ball Championship 
2011 CSI US Bar Table 9-Ball Championship 
2011 CSI US Bar Table 10-Ball Championship 
2011 CSI US Bar Table All-Around Title
2012 Texas Open 9-Ball Championship
2012 Space City 9-Ball Championship
2013 Texas Open 9-Ball Championship
2013 Big Tyme Classic 9-Ball
2013 CSI US Bar Table All-Around Title
2014 Texas Open 9-Ball Championship 
2014 Big Tyme Classic 9-Ball
2014 Texas Tornado Championship
2014 Houston 9-Ball Open 
2015 WPBA Hall of Fame
2015 Chinook Winds Open 8-Ball 
2015 Texas Open 9-Ball Championship
2015 Big Tyme Classic 9-Ball
2017 Texas Open 9-Ball Championship
2018 WPBA Signature Tour Stop
2018 Ashton Twins Classic

References

External links
 

female pool players
American pool players 
1965 births
Living people